John Wittewrong(e) may refer to:

 Sir John Wittewrong, 1st Baronet (1618–1693), English parliamentarian colonel
Sir John Wittewrong, 2nd Baronet of the Wittewrong baronets
 Sir John Wittewronge, 3rd Baronet (1673-1722), English MP
Sir John Wittewrong, 4th Baronet (1695-1743) of the Wittewrong baronets
Sir William Wittewrong, 5th Baronet (1697-1761) of the Wittewrong baronets
Sir John Wittewrong, 6th Baronet (died 1771) of the Wittewrong baronets